Glenn Allen Hegar Jr. (born 25 November 1970) is an American attorney who serves as Texas Comptroller of Public Accounts. He was a Republican member of the Texas Senate representing the 18th District, west of Houston. He succeeded fellow Republican Susan Combs as comptroller on January 2, 2015. He was elected Comptroller in the general election on November 4, 2014.

Hegar gained prominence in 2022 as the gatekeeper to the Texas's $330 billion in investment assets, following a letter he sent to more than 100 of the world's largest financial firms demanding that they make clear whether they restrict business with the fossil-fuel industry. If so, they would risk getting shut out of working with the fastest-growing US state.

Texas State legislature
Hegar was elected to the Texas House in 2002 and served in District 28. He won re-election in 2004.

He was elected to the Texas Senate in 2006 and was re-elected in 2010 and 2012. Hegar resigned from the Senate on December 5, 2014 after his election as Texas Comptroller.

Texas State Comptroller

2014 election

Hegar faced three opponents Republican nomination for state comptroller: State Representative Harvey Hilderbran of Kerrville, Debra Medina of Wharton, an activist with the Tea Party movement, and the former State Representative Raul Torres of Corpus Christi. Hegar finished with 49.99% of the vote with 610,512 votes (49.99 percent), and Hildebran opted to forgo a runoff election. Hilderbran polled 317,731 votes (26.01 percent). Debra Medina finished third with 235,713 votes (19.3 percent), and Raul Torres polled 57,255 votes (4.7 percent).

Hegar, with 58.4 percent of the vote, defeated the Democratic nominee Mike Collier, a businessman from Houston, in the November 4 general election.

2018 election

Hegar won election to a second term in the 2018 general election.

In 2021, Hegar proposed to weaken the rules for transparency and accountability for the biggest corporate tax break program in Texas., Chapter 313.

Political positions
Hegar is a conservative, who says he seeks to defend "the values of faith, family, and freedom".

Hegar opposes abortion. Texas Right to Life awarded him the "Perfectly Pro-Life Award". In the 83rd Legislative Session in 2013, Hegar was the author of Texas Senate Bill 5 and introduced the bill into the Senate. The Texas House passed the bill on July 10, 2013, by a 96–49 margin and sent the measure to the Texas Senate. The Texas Senate passed the bill on July 13, 2013, with a bipartisan vote of nineteen to eleven. The bill was signed by Governor Rick Perry on July 18, 2013. The bill was a list of measures that would add and update abortion regulations in Texas. Major sections of the law were struck down in the United States Supreme Court case Whole Woman’s Health v. Hellerstedt.

He twice denied the compensation to Dewayne Brown fo wrongfully conviction despite a court ruling of him being innocent.

Election history

2018

2014

2010

2006

Personal life
Born to teenage parents, Hegar is a sixth-generation Texan who farms on the 4,000 acre land that has been in his family since the mid-19th century. He grew up in Hockley, also in Harris County. Hegar met his wife Dara while attending St. Mary's University.
He with his wife Dara, and their three childrenlive in Katy, where they attend St. Peter's United Methodist Church. Hegar highlighted his wife and children in most of his television commercials in the race for comptroller.

References

External links

 Glenn Hegar Official Campaign Website 
 Senate of Texas - Senator Glenn Hegar 
 Project Vote Smart - Senator Glenn Hegar Jr. (TX) Profile
 State Sen. Glenn Hegar, District 18 (R-Katy), Texas Tribune Profile
 Follow the Money - Glenn Hegar
2006 2004 2002 campaign contributions

|-

|-

1970 births
21st-century American politicians
Comptrollers of Texas
Farmers from Texas
Living people
Republican Party members of the Texas House of Representatives
People from Hockley, Texas
People from Houston
People from Katy, Texas
St. Mary's University School of Law alumni
Texas A&M University alumni
Republican Party Texas state senators
University of Arkansas alumni